Gabriel Abraham (born 22 March 1991 in Galați) is a Romanian footballer who plays as a goalkeeper. He is a free agent.

External links

1991 births
Living people
Sportspeople from Galați
Romanian footballers
Association football goalkeepers
ASA 2013 Târgu Mureș players
FC Dinamo București players
Liga I players